Gui ( or ) is a Chinese surname.

Notable people
 Gui Minhai (Chinese: 桂敏海 or 桂民海; pinyin: Guì Mǐnhǎi or Guì Mínhǎi; 1964-), also known as Michael Gui, is a Chinese-born Swedish book publisher and writer
 Gwei Lun-mei (Chinese: 桂綸鎂; 1983-), Taiwanese actress
 Gui Hong (桂宏; 1995-), Chinese footballer
 Gua Ah-leh (歸亞蕾; 1944-), Taiwanese actress and singer

Chinese-language surnames
Individual Chinese surnames